Dhiren Mistry (born 5 September 1992) is an Indian first-class cricketer who plays for Baroda.

References

External links
 

1992 births
Living people
Indian cricketers
Baroda cricketers
People from Vadodara